The Long Kill is a 1999 American Western film. It was also known as Outlaw Justice. It was shot in Spain. The film was very popular on video.

Cast
Willie Nelson
Kris Kristofferson
Travis Tritt
Waylon Jennings

References

External links
 Outlaw Justice at Letterbox DVD
 The Long Kill at IMDb

1999 films
1999 Western (genre) films
American Western (genre) films
Films shot in Spain
1990s American films